Gabara pulverosalis is a species of moth in the family Erebidae. The species is found in North America, including Indiana, North Carolina and Florida.

The wingspan is about 20 mm.

The larvae probably feed on wiregrass.

References

External links
Species info
Images
Bug Guide

Scolecocampinae